Eclipta collarti is a species of beetle in the family Cerambycidae. It was described by Ernst Fuchs in 1959.

References

Eclipta (beetle)
Beetles described in 1959